Goniocidaris umbraculum is a species of cidaroid sea urchin that inhabits the continental shelf off the southern coasts of New Zealand.

Description
The main spines are thick, blunt, and usually shorter that the test diameter. The ones on the aboral (upper) surface have small flat discs at the tip, and thorn-like projections near the base. The test is greenish-brown and the spines are pale brown, often tinged green near the base. They are often overgrown by epiphytes such as hydroids, sponges and bryozoa.

Distribution and habitat

Ecology

This sea urchin broods its eggs, carrying them on the flared peristome that surrounds its mouth. Prior to research into its breeding biology, only two other sea urchins that brood their young had been studied, Cassidulus caribaearum and Abatus cordatus, though several arctic and subarctic species were known to do so.

Goniocidaris umbraculum is a gonochoric species, individuals being either male or female. Spawning takes place around July. The eggs have large yolks and are buoyant, and if detached from the female, float to the surface. As they emerge from the gonopore on the aboral surface of the female, the eggs are retained. They are then moved to the peristome, a process that takes several minutes and is achieved by the action of the tube feet and cilia, the eggs being guided along channels between the spines; the peristome becomes slightly depressed in order to accommodate the eggs, which are retained by the spines surrounding the mouth for about two months. Sixty eggs can be held in place, and when the juveniles have developed tube feet, they move to other parts of the test, but continue to be brooded for another two months. This unusual reproductive strategy may have developed when this species evolved to live in the colder waters further south than other members of its genus.

Goniocidaris umbraculum feeds on the bryozoan Filicea elegans.

References

Cidaridae
Fauna of the Pacific Ocean
Echinoderms of New Zealand
Marine fauna of New Zealand
Endemic fauna of New Zealand
Animals described in 1878
Taxa named by Frederick Hutton (scientist)
Endemic echinoderms of New Zealand